The works of American philosopher Josiah Royce (November 20, 1855 – September 14, 1916) include magazine articles, book reviews, other occasional writings, and several books.

Works

Posthumous

Articles

Book reviews

Other works
 "Two Days in Life's Woods," The Overland Monthly, Vol. I, Second series, 1883, pp. 594–595 (A poem).
 "Preliminary Report of the Committee on Apparitions and Haunted Houses," Proceedings of the American Society for Psychical Research, Vol. I, 1886, pp. 128–129. 
 "Report of the Committee on Phantasms and Presentiments," Proceedings of the American Society for Psychical Research, Vol. I, 1889, pp. 350–428.
 The Letters of Josiah Royce. Chicago: University of Chicago Press, 1970.

References

Bibliographies by writer
Bibliographies of American writers
Philosophy bibliographies